The 1939 Claxton Shield was the sixth annual Claxton Shield, an Australian national baseball tournament. It was held at Richmond Cricket Ground, Albert Ground, South Melbourne Cricket Ground and National Park in Melbourne from 29 July to 5 August, the second time Melbourne had hosted the Shield. New South Wales won the Shield for the third time, successfully defending their title from the previous two years. Queensland joined the other four states for the first time in the tournament. The other participating teams were Victoria, Western Australia and South Australia. It was also the first year an Australia national team was picked primarily based on the Championships.

Format
As had been the case in the 1937 tournament, the four teams played a round-robin schedule, meeting each other team once, with two competition points were on offer in each game. The points were awarded as follows:
 Win – two points
 Tie – one point
 Loss – no points
At the end of these preliminary games, the top two teams played each other to determine the champions, while the remaining two teams faced each other to determine third place. In the event of a tie between teams in terms of points, the tiebreaker used would have been the net runs for and against, with the team achieving the greater value placing in the higher position.

Results

Preliminaries

Finals

Third place final

Championship game

All-Australian team
At the conclusion of the tournament, representatives from the Australian Baseball Council selected an All-Australian team. Though the selected team did not actually play together, it was the first time an Australian team had been selected.

References

Bibliography
 
 

Claxton Shield
Claxton Shield
Claxton Shield
August 1939 sports events
July 1939 sports events